The arrondissement of Évreux is an arrondissement of France in the Eure department in the Normandy region. It has 103 communes.

Composition

The communes of the arrondissement of Évreux are:

Acon
Angerville-la-Campagne
Arnières-sur-Iton
Aulnay-sur-Iton
Les Authieux
Aviron
La Baronnie
Les Baux-Sainte-Croix
Beaubray
Bois-le-Roi
Boncourt
La Bonneville-sur-Iton
Le Boulay-Morin
Bretagnolles
Burey
Caugé
Champ-Dolent
Champigny-la-Futelaye
La Chapelle-du-Bois-des-Faulx
Chavigny-Bailleul
Cierrey
Claville
Collandres-Quincarnon
Conches-en-Ouche
Coudres
Courdemanche
La Couture-Boussey
La Croisille
Croth
Dardez
Droisy
Émalleville
Épieds
Évreux
Ézy-sur-Eure
Fauville
Faverolles-la-Campagne
Ferrières-Haut-Clocher
La Ferrière-sur-Risle
Le Fidelaire
La Forêt-du-Parc
Foucrainville
Fresney
Garennes-sur-Eure
Gauciel
Gaudreville-la-Rivière
Gauville-la-Campagne
Glisolles
Gravigny
Grossœuvre
Guichainville
L'Habit
Huest
Illiers-l'Évêque
Irreville
Ivry-la-Bataille
Jumelles
Lignerolles
Louversey
Louye
La Madeleine-de-Nonancourt
Marcilly-la-Campagne
Marcilly-sur-Eure
Le Mesnil-Fuguet
Mesnil-sur-l'Estrée
Miserey
Moisville
Mouettes
Mousseaux-Neuville
Muzy
Nagel-Séez-Mesnil
Nogent-le-Sec
Nonancourt
Normanville
Ormes
Parville
Le Plessis-Grohan
Portes
Prey
Reuilly
Sacquenville
Saint-André-de-l'Eure
Saint-Élier
Sainte-Marthe
Saint-Georges-Motel
Saint-Germain-de-Fresney
Saint-Germain-des-Angles
Saint-Germain-sur-Avre
Saint-Laurent-des-Bois
Saint-Luc
Saint-Martin-la-Campagne
Saint-Sébastien-de-Morsent
Saint-Vigor
Sassey
Sébécourt
Serez
Tilleul-Dame-Agnès
Tourneville
La Trinité
Le Val-David
Le Val-Doré
Les Ventes
Le Vieil-Évreux

History

The arrondissement of Évreux was created in 1800. On 1 January 2006, the two cantons of Louviers-Nord and Louviers-Sud that previously belonged to the arrondissement of Évreux were added to the arrondissement of Les Andelys, and the canton of Amfreville-la-Campagne to the arrondissement of Bernay. At the January 2017 reorganisation of the arrondissements of Eure, it lost 35 communes to the arrondissement of Les Andelys and 77 communes to the arrondissement of Bernay, and it gained one commune from the arrondissement of Bernay.

As a result of the reorganisation of the cantons of France which came into effect in 2015, the borders of the cantons are no longer related to the borders of the arrondissements. The cantons of the arrondissement of Évreux were, as of January 2015:

 Breteuil
 Conches-en-Ouche
 Damville
 Évreux-Est
 Évreux-Nord
 Évreux-Ouest
 Évreux-Sud
 Le Neubourg
 Nonancourt
 Pacy-sur-Eure
 Rugles
 Saint-André-de-l'Eure
 Verneuil-sur-Avre
 Vernon-Nord
 Vernon-Sud

References

Evreux